Events from the year 1795 in Scotland.

Incumbents

Law officers 
 Lord Advocate – Robert Dundas of Arniston
 Solicitor General for Scotland – Robert Blair

Judiciary 
 Lord President of the Court of Session – Lord Succoth
 Lord Justice General – The Duke of Montrose
 Lord Justice Clerk – Lord Braxfield

Events 
 18 November – the River Clyde, in spate, floods the centre of Glasgow and brings down the recently erected bridge at the foot of the Saltmarket.
 Gallowgate Barracks in Glasgow are built.

Births 
 25 May – George Meikle Kemp, designer of the (uncompleted) Scott Monument (died 1844)
 19 June – James Braid, surgeon and scientist, often regarded as the first genuine hypnotherapist (died 1860 in England)
 6 September – Frances Wright, freethinker (died 1852 in the United States)
 12 October – Janet Hamilton, née Thomson, poet and essayist (died 1873)
 10 November – Walter Geikie, painter (died 1837)
 4 December – Thomas Carlyle, historian, philosopher and essayist (died 1881 in England)
 10 December – Sir George Burns, shipowner (died 1890)
 21 December – Robert Moffat, missionary (died 1883)

Deaths 
 22 February – Alexander Gerard, philosopher (born 1728)
 19 May – James Boswell, diarist and biographer of Samuel Johnson (born 1740)
 23 June – James Craig, architect, planner of the New Town, Edinburgh (born 1744)
 24 June – William Smellie, encyclopedist and naturalist (born 1740)

The arts
Archibald Constable starts in business for himself as a dealer in rare books in Edinburgh, origin of the publishing business which enters the 21st century as Constable & Robinson.

Sport 
 17 January – Duddingston Curling Society formally organised.

See also 

Timeline of Scottish history
 1795 in Great Britain

References 

 
 Scotland
1790s in Scotland